Wierzchominko  (German: Varchminshagen) is a village in the administrative district of Gmina Będzino, within Koszalin County, West Pomeranian Voivodeship, in north-western Poland.

References

Wierzchominko